Mohammed Jamal (Arabic:محمد جمال) (born 11 May 1994) is an Emirati footballer. He currently plays as a midfielder for Al Jazira on loan from Al-Ain.

External links

References

Emirati footballers
1994 births
Living people
Al Jazira Club players
Al Ain FC players
UAE Pro League players
Association football midfielders